Mississippi Highway 33 (MS 33) is a state highway in southwestern Mississippi.

Route description

MS 33 begins in Wilkinson County at the Louisiana state line, with it continuing south as Louisiana Highway 19 (LA 19) into Norwood. It heads north through woodlands, then farmland for several miles, passing through Whitaker before entering the Centreville city limits and becoming concurrent (overlapped) with MS 24. The highway heads east through a business district as it bypasses downtown along its southern side and crosses into neighboring Amite County, where they have an intersection with MS 48, before leaving Centreville and heading due north through farmland for several miles. MS 24/MS 33 travel through the town of Gloster, bypassing downtown along its eastern side before MS 24 splits off and heads east while MS 33 heads north to enter the Homochitto National Forest. MS 33 winds its way northwest through hilly remote woodlands for several miles before exiting the forest and straddles the county line with Wilkinson County as it passes through the community of Coles, the town of Crosby, has an intersection with MS 563, and passes through the community of Rosetta before crossing the Homochitto River into Franklin County.

MS 33 immediately re-enters the National Forest for the next several miles, exiting only briefly at times to pass through the communities of Knoxville, Franklin, and the town of Roxie, where it has an intersection with US 84 (formerly also part of US 98). The highway travels through more remote woodlands of the forest for several miles to pass through the community of Hamburg to cross into Jefferson County.

MS 33 passes through the community of McNair before  exiting the National Forest and becoming concurrent with MS 28. The highway enters the Fayette city limits and passes by several homes and businesses, bypassing downtown along its western side before both MS 33 and MS 28 come to an end at an intersection with US 61.

The entire route of Mississippi Highway 33 is a rural two-lane highway.

History

In April 1974, the bridge on MS 33 over the Homochitto River in Rosetta was washed out during a flood on the river that year. This was due to many flood control projects on the river by the U.S. Army Corps of Engineers, beginning in 1938 with the construction of the Abernathy Channel, and continuing until 1952 with channelizing and straightening out the lower portion of the river. This resulted in increased stream flow velocity, causing accelerated erosion and scour, which in turn leads to bank instability. All this caused bridges to wash out along the lower portion of the river during floods, beginning in a 1955 flood with the US 61 bridge in Kingston, the Illinois Central Railroad bridge at Rosetta, and a country road bridge on the tributary Second Creek. In 1969 a bridge on the tributary Crooked Creek was washed out, and in 1971 the MS 33 bridge at Rosetta was washed out. During the flood of 1974 both the MS 33 bridge and the Illinois Central bridge at Rosetta were washed out.

Major intersections

References

External links

Magnolia Meanderings

033
Transportation in Wilkinson County, Mississippi
Transportation in Amite County, Mississippi
Transportation in Franklin County, Mississippi
Transportation in Jefferson County, Mississippi